Democrats for a Strong Bulgaria is a political party in Bulgaria established by former Bulgarian Prime Minister Ivan Kostov (1997–2001).

History 
Kostov resigned as chairman of the United Democratic Forces after a painful election defeat in June 2001 to Simeon Saxe-Coburg-Gotha's newly established National Movement for Simeon II. The UDF had suffered heavily from allegations of corruption and increased unemployment after having carried out economic reforms during its four-year term.

With time 29 (out of 51) UDF MPs including Kostov grew increasingly dissatisfied with the new UDF leadership of chairwoman Nadezhda Mihailova, who was the foreign minister in Kostov's own government. Following another defeat for the UDF in the 2003 local elections and after Nadezhda Mihailova's refusal to bear the responsibility and resign, the group of 29 around Kostov announced their departure from the UDF and the formation of a new political force, the DSB.

DSB is a member of the European People's Party (EPP).

On 30 March 2020, during the COVID-19 pandemic in the country, the Sofia City Council members from Democratic Bulgaria, a coalition Democrats for a Strong Bulgaria is part of, proposed a package of measures in defense of local economy. Those included ten-fold tax cut for landlords for leasing an apartment, rent-free period for businesses renting municipal property for the duration of the national emergency, and reorganization of Sofia public transport in view of the reduced passenger flow.

Leaders 

It was chaired by Ivan Kostov since its establishment in May 2004 until June 2013. He resigned after failing to reach the 4% electoral threshold in the 2013 election. The party was chaired by Radan Kanev, until his resignation following the 2017 election. Since then it has been chaired by Atanas Atanasov.

• Ivan Kostov (2004 - 2013)

• Radan Kanev (2013 - 2017)

• Atanas Atanasov (2017 -

Electoral results

Statistics

Program 

The DSB define themselves as a moderately conservative, but also nationally oriented party.

They regard themselves as successors of the ruling mandate of the United Democratic Forces (1997–2001) and promise to stand up for its achievements and build on them.

The party stands for a new structure, composition and organization of the constitutional powers in Bulgaria through the adoption of a new Constitution.

They propose a decrease in overall taxes, the creation of an investor-friendly tax and insurance environment and tax and insurance incentives to small and medium-sized enterprises and to companies that generate long-term employment. The DSB propose to reform the law enforcement institutions in order to cut off their connection with the criminal world and in order to abolish corruption. They also insist on making officials of the executive and the other branches of power fully accountable for their actions stripping them of their immunity.

They support the independence and public nature of the National Health Insurance Fund, the promotion of additional health insurance schemes through optional funds and competition between these funds.

The DSB stand for integration and coexistence of different ethnic communities on the basis of equality before the Law, regardless of religion, gender and origin and strongly oppose Ahmed Dogan, the leader of the Movement for Rights and Freedoms claiming that his "Bulgarian Ethnic Model" is one of separation and encapsulation of Bulgarian Turks, aimed at monopolizing their vote instead of integrating them in Bulgarian society. This opposition has often been wrongly referred to as anti-minority nationalism.

Kostov and the DSB are outspoken opponents of the Bulgarian Socialist Party whom they regard as the heir to the totalitarian Bulgarian Communist Party and define them as their main political enemy. They have also often criticized ex-Prime Minister Simeon Saxe-Coburg-Gotha for allying himself with the socialists and who is accused, very much like Kostov was, of corruption.

Kostov's government was the one to begin adhesion talks with the European Union back in 1999 and the DSB continue to support European orientation for the country.

Before the elections of June 2005 Democrats for a Strong Bulgaria issued the Treaty for a Strong Bulgaria which is a 12-point resume of their program.

See also

References

External links

 
 

2004 establishments in Bulgaria
Anti-communist parties
Conservative parties in Bulgaria
Conservative liberal parties
Liberal parties in Bulgaria
Member parties of the European People's Party
National conservative parties
Political parties established in 2004
Pro-European political parties in Bulgaria